The 2021–22 Danish 3rd Division was the first edition of the reinstated Danish 3rd Division since the 1990 season. The season started with a group of twelve teams. After 22 rounds the group was split in a promotion group and a relegation group. The top two teams of the promotion group was promoted to the 2022–23 Danish 2nd Division.

Participants
Karlslunde IF, Herlev IF, IF Lyseng, and Young Boys FD were promoted from the 2020–21 Denmark Series.

Stadia and locations

League table

Promotion Group
The top 6 teams will compete for 2 spots in the 2022–23 Danish 2nd Division.
Points and goals carried over in full from the regular season.

Relegation Group
The bottom 6 teams  will compete to avoid the 4 relegations spots to the 2022–23 Denmark Series.
Points and goals carried over in full from the regular season.

References

External links
  Danish FA

2021–22 in Danish football
Danish 3rd Division
Danish 3rd Division seasons